Motueka Island, also known by the name Pigeon Island, is an island off the coast of the Coromandel Peninsula in New Zealand.

Geography

The island is located 1.5 kilometres north-east of Cathedral Cove, to the east of Mercury Bay. It is tidally linked to Poikeke Island, a smaller island located to the west. The island reaches a height of 66 metres. Motueka Island is within the Te Whanganui-A-Hei (Cathedral Cove) Marine Reserve.

Motueka Island is an eroded Miocene era lava dome, composed of flow-banded rhyolite.

Biodiversity

The island is primarily forested by native New Zealand flora, including kohekohe, karaka, māhoe, whārangi, tawāpou, pūriri and parapara. The summit area is a plateau, forested by large pōhutukawa trees.

The island is a nesting place for Pterodroma gouldi (ōi / the grey-faced petrel). Several hundred birds nest on the island, despite the presence of Norway rats.

History

The island is historically significant to Ngāti Hei, who are the mana whenua iwi for Mouteka Island. It was given the traditional name Te Kuraetanga o taku Ihu, named by the rangatira Hei, who likened the island to his tā moko. During the early European colonial period, the island gained the name Pigeon Island.

References

Islands of Waikato
Miocene lava domes
Protected areas of Waikato
Thames-Coromandel District
Volcanic islands of New Zealand
Volcanoes of Waikato
Uninhabited islands of New Zealand